The following is a timeline of the history of the city of Nîmes, France.

Prior to 18th century

 3rd century BCE –  (tower) in existence.
 121 BCE – Romans in power.
 1st century CE – Arena of Nîmes and Pont du Gard (aqueduct) built (approximate date).
 394 – First Council of Nîmes
 5th century CE – Roman Catholic Diocese of Nîmes established.
 407 – Nîmes "pillaged by the Vandals."
 737 – Nîmes "sacked by Charles Martel".
 1096 – Third Council of Nîmes
 1185 – Count of Toulouse in power.
 1207 - City took part in the Albigensian Crusade.
 1567 – Religious unrest ("Michelade"); Catholics killed.
 1682 –  active.

 1687 - Louis XIV built a fortress.

18th–19th centuries
 1703 – April:  of Protestants occurs near Nîmes, during the War of the Camisards.
 1790
 Nîmes becomes part of the Gard souveraineté.
 1800 - Population: 39,594.
 1803
  established.
  opens.
 1815
 Austrian military under von Neipperg in Nîmes.
 White Terror occurs.
 1821 – Musée des Beaux-Arts de Nîmes founded.
 1846 –  built.
 1851 –  created.
 1852 – Railway  construction completed.
 1871 – Société d'étude des sciences naturelles de Nîmes et du Gard founded.
 1876 – Population: 63,001.
 1877 – Journal du Midi newspaper begins publication.
 1880 –  begins operating.
 1886 – Population: 69,898.
 1895 –  founded.

20th century

 1910 – Industrialist and Merchant's Union formed.
 1911 – Population: 80,437.
 1920 –  established.
 1952 – Feria de Nîmes (festival) begins.
 1968 – Population: 123,292 in city; 309,549 in arrondissement.
 1973 –  and  created.
 1982
 Nîmes becomes part of the Languedoc-Roussillon region.
  created.
 1999 – Population: 133,424 in city; 457,769 in arrondissement.

21st century

 2001 – Jean-Paul Fournier becomes mayor.
 2012
  begins operating.
 Population: 146,709 in city; 538,211 in arrondissement.
 2014 – March:  held.
 2015
 March:  held.
 December:  held.
  construction begins.
 2016 – Nîmes becomes part of the Occitanie region.

See also
 Nîmes history
 
  (Roman-era)
 
 
  department

Other cities in the Occitanie region:
 Timeline of Montpellier
 Timeline of Perpignan
 Timeline of Toulouse

References

This article incorporates information from the French Wikipedia.

Bibliography

in English

in French

External links

 Items related to Nîmes, various dates (via Europeana).
 Items related to Nîmes, various dates (via Digital Public Library of America).

nimes
Nîmes
nimes